Catalyst Inc. is a global nonprofit founded by feminist writer and advocate Felice Schwartz in 1962. Schwartz also served as Catalyst's president for 31 years.

Catalyst's stated mission is to "accelerate progress for women through workplace inclusion." Recent topics of focus include: board diversity; gender, race and ethnicity; inclusive cultures; LGBTQ; men and equality; the gender pay gap; sexual harassment; and unconscious bias. Catalyst also offers consulting services to supporter organizations seeking to improve workplace culture, diversity and inclusion, initiative outcomes and representation of women in their organizations.

In addition to research activities, Catalyst has launched targeted initiatives to increase the number of women in leadership positions. These initiatives include Catalyst CEO Champions For Change, Catalyst Women on Board, Enlist Men's Support For Gender Equality, Men Advocating Real Change/MARC), and celebrate individuals and organizations that are positive role models for change (Catalyst Awards, Catalyst Canada Honours).

History

Founding 
In 1951, after her father died, Felice Schwartz joined her brother Theodore Nierenberg to help turn around their father's failing business. Married and a mother, Schwartz worked as the vice president of production until they sold the business for a small profit three-and-a-half years later. The experiences Schwartz gained while working and raising a family spurred her to found Catalyst in 1962 with the stated mission, "to bring to our country's needs the unused abilities of intelligent women who want to combine work and family."

The Early Years: 1960s 
The 1960s saw Catalyst focused on promoting job-sharing programs and collecting and disseminating information to women who were interested in pursuing a career.

In 1966, Catalyst partnered with the Massachusetts Department of Public Welfare to launch a pilot job-sharing program for women. Twenty-five jobs as a welfare case worker were opened for 50 women. In 1971, Part-Time Social Workers in Public Welfare was published showing that these 50 women were 89% as productive as full-time case workers and had one-third less turnover as full-time case workers.

The 1970s & 1980s 
As more women entered the workforce, Catalyst shifted its focus to topics such as dual career families, child care and women on corporate boards. Catalyst established the Corporate Child Care Resource to monitor child care activities around the country and report on best practices. Catalyst branched out from the public sector into the private sector, gaining corporate supporters.

Schwartz became a more prominent voice in the women's movement. She authored numerous articles, was interviewed by the media and co-authored her first book, How to Go to Work When Your Husband Is Against It, Your Children Aren't Old Enough, and There's Nothing You Can Do Anyhow, along with her Catalyst colleagues Margaret H. Schifter and Susan S. Gillotti. She launched the Catalyst Awards to recognize women board directors.

The Mommy Track Controversy 
Schwartz was a prolific writer but is most known for her 1989 article, Management Women and the New Facts of Life published in Harvard Business Review. Schwartz sparked a national debate by stating that "the cost of employing women in management is greater than the cost of employing men," and suggesting that employers create two tracks for women, one for the career focused and one for the family focused.

In response to the article, the New York Times published 'Mommy Career Track' Sets Off a Furor, and branded Schwartz as the "mommy track" creator. The Times article quoted prominent feminists who called the idea of two career paths "horrifying" and "damaging to women's advancement." Critics claimed the article validated the idea that women could have a family or a career but not both. Adding to the controversy was the lack of corroborating evidence for Schwartz's assertions. Her critics stated, ''If this is such hot stuff, where's the documentation?''

Schwartz claimed that her article was misinterpreted, saying, "I violated the politically correct thing by saying that women are not just like men. What I said then and still say is that women face many, many obstacles in the workplace that men do not face. I was saying to that group of men at the top, 'Rather than let women's talents go to waste, do something about it.'"

In 1992, Schwartz published the book, Breaking with Tradition: Women and Work, The New Facts of Life, a response and expansion of the "mommy track" idea.

Ten years after the original article was published, Schwartz's son Tony revisited the debate and offered up some insights from the controversy. In his article, Tony Schwartz argues that his mother's idea of dividing women into two categories was misguided, but her argument that to retain women companies need to give them more flexibility to manage a career and family, was on point.

The End of the Schwartz Era 
After 31 years at the helm of Catalyst, Schwartz retired in 1993. She was in failing health and passed away in 1996 at the age of 71. Shortly thereafter, her final book was published, The Armchair Activist: Simple Yet Powerful Ways to Fight the Radical Right, co-authored with Suzanne K. Levine.

1993 and Beyond 
Since the Schwartz era and through its next three presidents, Catalyst expanded its offerings and geographic footprint.
In 1993, the Board appointed Sheila Wellington, a former vice-president of Yale University, to become the new president and CEO. As the leader of Catalyst, Wellington instituted more rigorous research standards, expanded Catalyst studies to include non-US geographies and women of color, and launched the annual Census of Women Board Directors, which became one of Catalyst's signature studies.

Wellington resigned in 2003 to accept a Professorship at New York University's Leonard N. Stern School of Business. She is now a board member of the Institute for Women's Policy Research and the Transitions Network, as well as serving on the NYC Commission on Women's Issues. 

In 2003, Ilene H. Lang assumed the role of president. Lang was a seasoned tech industry executive who was the founding CEO of AltaVista Internet Software Inc., a First Light Capital venture partner, and a previous senior executive at Lotus Development Corporation. During her tenure, Lang further expanded Catalyst globally, opening offices in Europe, India, Australia and Japan.

In 2014, Lang stepped down, and Deborah Gillis was named President & CEO. A Canadian, Gillis was the first non-American President & CEO. Prior to joining Catalyst, she worked in the public sector for the governments of Nova Scotia and Ontario and as a consultant for PricewaterhouseCoopers and Grant Thornton.

In 2018, Gillis stepped down to accept the position of President & CEO of the Centre for Addiction and Mental Health (CAMH) Foundation, and Ilene H. Lang resumed her former leadership role as Catalyst's Interim President & CEO. In August 2018, Lorraine Hariton became President & CEO.

Organization

Leadership 
Catalyst's President & CEO is Lorraine Hariton, who previously held senior-level positions in Silicon Valley, as well as leadership roles across the private, nonprofit, and government sectors, assumed the role of President & CEO on September 1, 2018. The Board of Directors Chair is Julie Sweet of Accenture.

Catalyst is governed by a Board of Directors that includes 36 companies from a variety of industries including: oil and gas, consumer products, retail, restaurants, accounting, consulting, business services, financial services, technology, travel, aerospace and defense, engineering, law, pharmaceuticals, health, and telecommunications.

Supporters 
Catalyst receives funding for research and ongoing operations from more than 800 supporter organizations across the globe.

Regions 
Catalyst has operations in the United States, Canada, Europe, and across the globe.

Major Initiatives

Catalyst CEO Champions For Change 
Launched on International Women's Day in 2017, the Catalyst CEO Champions For Change initiative showcases commitments by CEOs to advancing all women, including women of color, into more leadership positions in their companies and on their boards. To participate, Catalyst asks CEOs to publicly declare their support, take a pledge of organizational and personal commitments, and report their company's progress each year against established diversity metrics. The first report on the participating companies' progress was released in November 2017.

Catalyst Awards 
Originally begun in 1976 to celebrate individual women board members, the Catalyst Award shifted to recognizing individual organizations in 1987. Since then, the award has recognized corporations and the specific programs they've created to recruit, develop, and advance women. Company initiatives are evaluated on seven criteria: strategy and rationale, senior leadership activities, accountability and transparency, communication, employee engagement, innovation, and measurable results. Catalyst has recognized 94 initiatives at 85 organizations from around the world since 1987.

To be considered for the award, companies must submit an application. For each applicant, the Catalyst Award Evaluation Committee conducts research and phone interviews before narrowing the field to a few organizations. For the selected companies, the Committee conducts further research via onsite visits. The Committee and Catalyst executive leadership determine the winners.

Initiatives are publicly celebrated at the annual Catalyst Awards Conference and Dinner held in New York City. The 2018 awards dinner had more than 2,000 attendees, including executives from global corporations, professional firms, governments, NGOs, and educational institutions.

Award Winners, 2011-2020

2011 — Kaiser Permanente, McDonald's, Time Warner
2012 — Commonwealth Bank, Sodexo
2013 — Alcoa, Coca-Cola Company, Unilever
2014 — Kimberly-Clark, Lockheed Martin
2015 — Chevron Corporation, Procter & Gamble
2016 — Gap
2017 — 3M, Bank of Montreal, Rockwell Automation
2018 — Boston Consulting Group, IBM, Nationwide, Northrop Grumman
2019 — Bank of America, Deutsche Post DHL Group, Eli Lilly & Company, Schneider Electric
2020 — Deloitte, Medtronic, Unilever

Publications 
Catalyst publishes across a wide range of topics, including: board diversity; gender, race, and ethnicity; inclusive cultures; LGBTQ men and equality; the gender pay gap; sexual harassment; and unconscious bias. Below is a list of some of their publications. Please consult the Catalyst website for a complete list:

 1992: Women in Engineering: An Untapped Resource
 1993: Creating Successful Mentoring Programs: A Catalyst Guide
 1994: Cracking the Glass Ceiling: Strategies for Success
 1995: The CEO View: Women On Corporate Boards
 1996: Women In Corporate Leadership: Progress & Prospects
 1997: A New Approach to Flexibility: Managing the Work/Time Equation
 1998: Women of Color in Corporate Management: Dynamics of Career Advancement
 1999: Women Scientists in Industry: A Winning Formula for Companies
 2000: Breaking the Barriers: Women in Senior Management in the UK
 2001: Women of Color Executives: Their Voices, Their Journeys
 2002: Europe, Women in Leadership: A European Business Imperative
 2003: Bit By Bit: A Catalyst Guide To Advancing Women In High Tech Companies
 2004: The Bottom Line: Connecting Corporate Performance and Gender Diversity
 2005: Women "Take Care," Men "Take Charge:" Stereotyping Of U.S. Business Leaders Exposed
 2006: Different Cultures, Similar Perceptions: Stereotyping of Western European Business Leaders
 2007: Making Change: LGBT Inclusion – Understanding the Challenges
 2008: Unwritten Rules: What You Don't Know Can Hurt Your Career
 2009: Opportunity or Setback? High Potential Women and Men During Economic Crisis
 2010: Pipeline's Broken Promise
 2011: Sponsoring Women to Success
 2012: Good Intentions, Imperfect Execution? Women Get Fewer Of the "Hot Jobs" Needed To Advance
 2013: High Potentials in the Pipeline: On Their Way to the Boardroom
 2014: Inclusive Leadership: The View from Six Countries
 2015: Think People, Not Just Programs, to Build Inclusive Workplaces
 2016: Emotional Tax: How Black Women and Men Pay More at Work and How Leaders Can Take Action
 2017: The Journey to Inclusion: Building Workplaces That Work for Women In Japan
 2018: Day-To-Day Experiences of Emotional Tax Among Women and Men of Color in the Workplace

See also
List of women CEOs of Fortune 500 companies

References

Non-profit organizations based in New York City
Organizations established in 1962